In the geometry of hyperbolic 3-space, the order-6-4 triangular honeycomb is a regular space-filling tessellation (or honeycomb) with Schläfli symbol {3,6,4}.

Geometry 
It has four triangular tiling {3,6} around each edge. All vertices are ultra-ideal (existing beyond the ideal boundary) with infinitely many triangular tilings existing around each vertex in an order-4 hexagonal tiling vertex arrangement.

It has a second construction as a uniform honeycomb, Schläfli symbol {3,61,1}, Coxeter diagram, with alternating types or colors of triangular tiling cells. In Coxeter notation the half symmetry is [3,6,4,1+] = [3,61,1].

Related polytopes and honeycombs 

It a part of a sequence of regular polychora and honeycombs with triangular tiling cells: {3,6,p}

Order-6-5 triangular honeycomb 

In the geometry of hyperbolic 3-space, the order-6-3 triangular honeycomb is a regular space-filling tessellation (or honeycomb) with Schläfli symbol {3,6,5}. It has five triangular tiling, {3,6}, around each edge. All vertices are ultra-ideal (existing beyond the ideal boundary) with infinitely many triangular tilings existing around each vertex in an order-5 hexagonal tiling vertex arrangement.

Order-6-6 triangular honeycomb

In the geometry of hyperbolic 3-space, the order-6-6 triangular honeycomb is a regular space-filling tessellation (or honeycomb) with Schläfli symbol {3,6,6}. It has infinitely many triangular tiling, {3,6}, around each edge. All vertices are ultra-ideal (existing beyond the ideal boundary) with infinitely many triangular tilings existing around each vertex in an order-6 triangular tiling vertex arrangement.

It has a second construction as a uniform honeycomb, Schläfli symbol {3,(6,3,6)}, Coxeter diagram,  = , with alternating types or colors of triangular tiling cells. In Coxeter notation the half symmetry is [3,6,6,1+] = [3,((6,3,6))].

Order-6-infinite triangular honeycomb

In the geometry of hyperbolic 3-space, the order-6-infinite triangular honeycomb is a regular space-filling tessellation (or honeycomb) with Schläfli symbol {3,6,∞}. It has infinitely many triangular tiling, {3,6}, around each edge. All vertices are ultra-ideal (existing beyond the ideal boundary) with infinitely many triangular tilings existing around each vertex in an infinite-order triangular tiling vertex arrangement.

It has a second construction as a uniform honeycomb, Schläfli symbol {3,(6,∞,6)}, Coxeter diagram,  = , with alternating types or colors of triangular tiling cells. In Coxeter notation the half symmetry is [3,6,∞,1+] = [3,((6,∞,6))].

See also 
 Convex uniform honeycombs in hyperbolic space
 List of regular polytopes

References 

Coxeter, Regular Polytopes, 3rd. ed., Dover Publications, 1973. . (Tables I and II: Regular polytopes and honeycombs, pp. 294–296)
 The Beauty of Geometry: Twelve Essays (1999), Dover Publications,  (Chapter 10, Regular Honeycombs in Hyperbolic Space) Table III
 Jeffrey R. Weeks The Shape of Space, 2nd edition  (Chapters 16–17: Geometries on Three-manifolds I,II)
 George Maxwell, Sphere Packings and Hyperbolic Reflection Groups, JOURNAL OF ALGEBRA 79,78-97 (1982) 
 Hao Chen, Jean-Philippe Labbé, Lorentzian Coxeter groups and Boyd-Maxwell ball packings, (2013)
 Visualizing Hyperbolic Honeycombs arXiv:1511.02851 Roice Nelson, Henry Segerman (2015)

External links
 Spherical Video: {3,6,∞} honeycomb with parabolic Möbius transform YouTube, Roice Nelson
John Baez, Visual insights: {7,3,3} Honeycomb (2014/08/01) {7,3,3} Honeycomb Meets Plane at Infinity (2014/08/14) 
 Danny Calegari, Kleinian, a tool for visualizing Kleinian groups, Geometry and the Imagination 4 March 2014. 

Honeycombs (geometry)